The 1990–91 Combined Counties Football League season was the 13th in the history of the Combined Counties Football League, a football competition in England.

The league was won by Farnham Town for the first time. There was no promotion this season.

League table

The league was reduced to 17 clubs from 18 after Cove were promoted to the Isthmian League, and Weybridge Town and Chobham left the league. Two new clubs joined:
Ashford Town, joining from the Surrey Premier League.
Sandhurst Town, joining from the Chiltonian League.

References

External links
 Combined Counties League Official Site

1990-91
1990–91 in English football leagues